Pao cochinchinensis is a species of freshwater pufferfish native to the basins of the Mekong and Chao Phraya Rivers.  This species grows to a length of  SL.

It is known for its reputation to attack people by slicing off bits of flesh. Their tendency to take chunks of human flesh is similar to piranhas. It is one of two pufferfish species to attack humans, the other species is the Ferocious Pufferfish (Feroxodon multistriatus).

References

External links
 Photograph

Tetraodontidae
Fish of the Mekong Basin
Fish of Cambodia
Fish of Laos
Fish of Thailand
Fish of Vietnam
Fish described in 1866